The Edinburgh Cabinet Library was a series of 38 books, mostly geographical, published from 1830 to 1844, and edited by Dionysius Lardner. The original price was 5 shillings for a volume; a later reissue of 30 of the volumes was at half that price. The publishers were Oliver and Boyd in Edinburgh, and Simpkin & Marshall in London.

Notes

Lists of books
1830s books
1840s books